H70 may refer to:

Vehicles
  also known as HMCS Saskatchewan (H70), a WWII British and Canadian destroyer
 Bell H-70 Arapaho, a U.S. light military helicopter
 Toyota HiAce H-70, a model of light commercial vehicle
 Hylas Yachts H70 sailing yacht

Places
 Shin-Hakodate-Hokuto Station (station code H70), Hokuto, Hokkaido, Japan
 Stratford Field (FAA airport code H70), Stratford, Texas, USA; see List of airports in Texas
 Asheville Observatory (observatory code H70), Asheville, North Carolina, USA; see List of observatory codes

Other uses
 IBM Multiprise series H70, a mainframe computer
 Hydrogen station fueling standard H70 at 700 bar pressure compressed hydrogen

See also

 70 (disambiguation)
 H (disambiguation)